Lophiodontidae is a family of browsing, herbivorous, mammals in the Perissodactyla suborder Ancylopoda that show long, curved and cleft claws. They lived in southern Europe during the Eocene epoch. Previously thought to be related to tapirs, it is now thought that they were most likely related to early chalicotheres, although they are distinct from that group.

References

Prehistoric mammal families